The 2019 WNBA season was the 23rd season for the Las Vegas Aces franchise of the WNBA and the 2nd year the franchise was based in Las Vegas. The season tipped off on May 26, 2019 versus the Los Angeles Sparks.

The Aces started the season 7–5 and were never able to put together a winning streak of more than two games.  However, the Aces improved in July and went 7–2 during that month.  Their record included two separate three game winning streaks.  One of their two losses actually occurred in August, due to an earthquake delayed game.  The Aces cooled off in August, going 6–5.  The record included a four game winning streak, and a three game losing streak.  The Aces locked up a post season bid on August 18.  The Aces went 1–1 in September to finish 21–13 on the year.  This record secured them the fourth seed in the playoffs.

As the fourth seed, the Aces hosted the Chicago Sky in their second round match.  The Aces won a close game 93–92 to advance to the semifinals.  There they faced the top-seeded Washington Mystics.  The Aces ended up losing to the Mystics, three games to one.

Transactions

WNBA Draft

Trades/Roster Changes

Current roster

Game log

Pre-season

|- style="background:#fcc;"
| 1
| May 19
| Minnesota Lynx
| L 75–79
| McBride (18)
| Swords (8)
| Plum (6)
| Cox Pavilion
| 0–1

Regular season

|- style="background:#bbffbb;"
| 1
| May 26
| Los Angeles Sparks
| W 83–70
| Wilson (21)
| Hamby (14)
| Plum (6)
| Mandalay Bay Events Center7,249
| 1–0
|- style="background:#fcc;"
| 2
| May 31
| @ Phoenix Mercury
| L 84–86
| McBride (15)
| Wilson (9)
| Wilson (4)
| Talking Stick Resort Arena14,090
| 1–1

|- style="background:#fcc;"
| 3
| June 2
| Connecticut Sun
| L 74–80
| Wilson (19)
| Wilson (9)
| Colson (5)
| Mandalay Bay Events Center2,747
| 1–2
|- style="background:#bbffbb;"
| 4
| June 6
| @ Atlanta Dream
| W 92–69
| Tied (15)
| Hamby (8)
| J. Young (8)
| State Farm Arena2,630
| 2–2
|- style="background:#fcc;"
| 5
| June 9
| @ New York Liberty
| L 78–88
| McBride (25)
| Cambage (10)
| McBride (4)
| Westchester County Center1,447
| 2–3
|- style="background:#bbffbb;"
| 6
| June 14
| New York Liberty
| W 100–65
| Plum (19)
| Wilson (8)
| J. Young (8)
| Mandalay Bay Events Center4,110
| 3–3
|- style="background:#bbffbb;"
| 7
| June 16
| @ Minnesota Lynx
| W 80–75
| McBride (22)
| Cambage (9)
| Hamby (4)
| Target Center8,392
| 4–3
|- style="background:#fcc;"
| 8
| June 20
| Washington Mystics
| L 72–95
| Wilson (28)
| Tied (6)
| Tied (4)
| Mandalay Bay Events Center4,416
| 4–4
|- style="background:#bbffbb;"
| 9
| June 22
| Dallas Wings
| W 86–68
| Hamby (27)
| Cambage (9)
| J. Young (8)
| Mandalay Bay Events Center4,347
| 5–4
|- style="background:#bbffbb;"
| 10
| June 25
| Seattle Storm
| W 60–56
| Cambage (14)
| Cambage (13)
| Colson (4)
| Mandalay Bay Events Center4,215
| 6–4
|- style="background:#fcc;"
| 11
| June 27
| @ Los Angeles Sparks
| L 74–86
| Cambage (18)
| Hamby (10)
| J. Young (9)
| Staples Center10,295
| 6–5
|- style="background:#bbffbb;"
| 12
| June 29
| Indiana Fever
| W 102–97 (OT)
| Wilson (39)
| Wilson (11)
| J. Young (10)
| Mandalay Bay Events Center4,581
| 7–5

|- style="background:#bbffbb;"
| 13
| July 2
| Chicago Sky
| W 90–82
| 3 tied (16)
| Cambage (9)
| J. Young (8)
| Mandalay Bay Events Center3,516
| 8–5
|- style="background:#fcc;"
| 14
| July 5
| Washington Mystics
| L 70–99
| Plum (17)
| Tied (5)
| Tied (5)
| Mandalay Bay Events CenterN/A
| 8–6
|- style="background:#bbffbb;"
| 15
| July 7
| @ New York Liberty
| W 90–58
| McBride (24)
| Cambage (11)
| Plum (6)
| Westchester County Center1,971
| 9–6
|- style="background:#bbffbb;"
| 16
| July 10
| @ Indiana Fever
| W 74–71
| Cambage (19)
| 3 Tied (6)
| 3 Tied (3)
| Bankers Life Fieldhouse9,247
| 10–6
|- style="background:#bbffbb;"
| 17
| July 13
| @ Washington Mystics
| W 85–81
| Tied (17)
| Cambage (9)
| 3 Tied (4)
| St. Elizabeth's East Arena4,200
| 11–6
|- style="background:#fcc;"
| 18
| July 19
| @ Seattle Storm
| L 66–69
| Cambage (16)
| Cambage (14)
| Tied (3)
| Alaska Airlines Arena9,000
| 11–7
|- style="background:#bbffbb;"
| 19
| July 21
| Minnesota Lynx
| W 79–74
| Cambage (22)
| Cambage (13)
| Plum (8)
| Mandalay Bay Events Center4,352
| 12–7
|- style="background:#bbffbb;"
| 20
| July 23
| Seattle Storm
| W 79–62
| Hamby (24)
| Cambage (12)
| Cambage (6)
| Mandalay Bay Events Center5,193
| 13–7
|- style="background:#bbffbb;"
| 21
| July 30
| Dallas Wings
| W 86–54
| Tied (18)
| Hamby (11)
| J. Young (7)
| Mandalay Bay Events Center3,756
| 14–7

|- style="background:#fcc;"
| 22
| August 1
| @ Los Angeles Sparks
| L 68–76
| McBride (19)
| Hamby (11)
| T. Young (6)
| Staples Center11,692
| 14–8
|- style="background:#bbffbb;"
| 23
| August 3
| @ Dallas Wings
| W 75–70
| McBride (21)
| Swords (10)
| J. Young (5)
| College Park Center5,882
| 15–8
|- style="background:#fcc;"
| 24
| August 9
| Chicago Sky
| L 84–87
| Cambage (28)
| Hamby (12)
| McBride (5)
| Mandalay Bay Events Center4,200
| 15–9
|- style="background:#bbffbb;"
| 25
| August 11
| Connecticut Sun
| W 89–81
| Cambage (21)
| Cambage (12)
| Tied (6)
| Mandalay Bay Events Center4,633
| 16–9
|- style="background:#bbffbb;"
| 26
| August 13
| Atlanta Dream
| W 94–90
| Hamby (23)
| Hamby (16)
| Cambage (6)
| Mandalay Bay Events Center3,532
| 17–9
|- style="background:#bbffbb;"
| 27
| August 18
| @ Chicago Sky
| W 100–85
| Wilson (25)
| Cambage (10)
| T. Young (4)
| Wintrust Arena6,072
| 18–9
|- style="background:#bbffbb;"
| 28
| August 20
| Phoenix Mercury
| W 84–79 (OT)
| Tied (19)
| Cambage (15)
| J. Young (10)
| Mandalay Bay Events Center5,032
| 19–9
|- style="background:#fcc;"
| 29
| August 23
| @ Connecticut Sun
| L 85–89
| Cambage (18)
| Hamby (10)
| J. Young (5)
| Mohegan Sun Arena7,483
| 19–10
|- style="background:#fcc;"
| 30
| August 25
| @ Minnesota Lynx
| L 77–98
| J. Young (14)
| Hamby (7)
| J. Young (5)
| Target Center8,834
| 19–11
|- style="background:#fcc;"
| 31
| August 27
| @ Indiana Fever
| L 71–86
| Wilson (18)
| Wilson (8)
| Plum (6)
| Bankers Life Fieldhouse6,958
| 19–12
|- style="background:#bbffbb;"
| 32
| August 31
| Los Angeles Sparks
| W 92–86
| Wilson (24)
| Tied (12)
| Tied (5)
| Mandalay Bay Events Center8,470
| 20–12

|- style="background:#fcc;"
| 33
| September 5
| @ Atlanta Dream
| L 74–78
| Wilson (19)
| Wilson (8)
| J. Young (9)
| State Farm Arena4,023
| 20–13
|- Style="background:#bbffbb;"
| 34
| September 8
| @ Phoenix Mercury
| W 98–89
| Cambage (21)
| Cambage (9)
| Tied (4)
| Talking Stick Resort Arena13,135
| 21–13

Playoffs

|- style="background:#bbffbb;"
| 1
| September 15
| Chicago Sky
| W 93–92
| Cambage (23)
| Cambage (17)
| Plum (6)
| Thomas & Mack Center7,981
| 1–0

|- style="background:#fcc;"
| 1
| September 17
| @ Washington Mystics
| L 95–97
| Wilson (23)
| Cambage (12)
| Plum (9)
| St. Elizabeth's East Arena3,968
| 0–1
|- style="background:#fcc;"
| 2
| September 19
| @ Washington Mystics
| L 91–103
| Cambage (23)
| Cambage (10)
| Plum (10)
| St. Elizabeth's East Arena4,200
| 0–2
|- style="background:#bbffbb;"
| 3
| September 22
| Washington Mystics
| W 92–75
| Cambage (28)
| Wilson (8)
| Plum (9)
| Mandalay Bay Events Center6,175
| 1–2
|- style="background:#fcc;"
| 4
| September 24
| Washington Mystics
| L 90–94
| Cambage (25)
| Cambage (12)
| Hamby (7)
| Mandalay Bay Events Center5,465
| 1–3

Standings

Playoffs

Statistics

Regular season

Awards and honors

References

External links
The Official Site of the Las Vegas Aces

Las Vegas Aces seasons
Las Vegas Aces